Helena Ann Kennedy, Baroness Kennedy of The Shaws, KC, FRSA, HonFRSE (born 12 May 1950), is a Scottish barrister, broadcaster, and Labour member of the House of Lords. She was Principal of Mansfield College, Oxford, from 2011 to 2018.

Early life and education
Kennedy was born on 12 May 1950 in Glasgow, Scotland, one of the four daughters of Mary Veronica (née Jones) and Joshua Patrick. Her parents were committed Labour activists and devoutly Roman Catholic. Her father, a printer with the Daily Record, was a trade union official.

She attended Holyrood Secondary School in Glasgow, where she was appointed Head Girl. She studied law at the Council of Legal Education in London.

Legal career
In 1972, Kennedy was called to the bar at Gray's Inn. Among her many cases, Kennedy acted as junior counsel for child murderer Myra Hindley during her 1974 trial for plotting to escape from Holloway Prison.

Politics
Kennedy rebels against her party whip in the House of Lords more frequently than any other Labour Peer, having a dissent rate of 33.3%. She was Chair of Charter 88 (1992–1997) and is closely affiliated to the educational charity Common Purpose. In 2020, she worked with the Conservative MP Iain Duncan Smith and democracy activist Luke de Pulford to create the global pressure group Inter-Parliamentary Alliance on China. In March 2021, China placed sanctions on her. The sanctions were condemned by the Prime Minister and led the Foreign Secretary to summon the Chinese ambassador.

Academia
Kennedy became the first Chancellor of Oxford Brookes University, serving from 1994 to 2001. Kennedy was elected principal of Mansfield College, Oxford in July 2010 and served from September 2011. She retired in 2018 and became Chancellor of Sheffield Hallam University on 26 July 2018.

Personal life
From 1978 to 1984 she lived with the actor Iain Mitchell, and together they had a son. In 1986, Kennedy married Iain Louis Hutchison, a surgeon, with whom she has a daughter and a son.

Kennedy regularly attends Mass and professes that her Roman Catholicism "remains very much part of who I am", even though she eschews its more traditional values.

Honours
She has received numerous academic awards, including:
 Fellow of the Royal Society of Arts (FRSA)
 Fellow of the City and Guilds of London Institute (FCGI)
 Honorary Fellow, Royal College of Psychiatrists, 2005
 Honorary Fellow, Royal College of Paediatrics and Child Health, 2005
 Honorary Fellow, Institute of Advanced Legal Studies
 Honorary Fellow, University of Cambridge, 2010
 Honorary Fellow, School of Oriental and African Studies (SOAS), 2011
 Honorary Doctorate of Law, Plymouth University, 2012
 Honorary Fellow of the Royal Society of Edinburgh (HonFRSE), 2014
 She was recognized as one of the BBC's 100 women of 2021.

Broadcasting

 Creator: Blind Justice, BBC TV, 1987
 Presenter: Heart of the Matter, BBC TV, 1987
 After Dark, Channel 4 and BBC4, 1987–2003
 She presented many editions of this series, including the "drunk Oliver Reed" episode, where the actor verbally insulted and attempted to kiss feminist Kate Millett 
 Presenter: Raw Deal on Medical Negligence, BBC TV, 1989
 Presenter: The Trial of 'Lady Chatterley's Lover, BBC Radio 4, 1990
 Presenter: Time Gentlemen, Please, BBC Scotland, 1994 (Winner, Television Programme Award category, 1994 Industrial Journalism Awards)
 Commissioner, BAFTA Inquiry into the future of the BBC, 1990

Appointments

 President, Helena Kennedy Foundation
 President of the Board the Governors of the School of Oriental and African Studies (SOAS)
 President, Women of the Year Lunch (2010–2015)
 Chair, JUSTICE
 Chair of the Board of Governors for the United World College of the Atlantic
 President, Medical Aid for Palestinians
 Patron, Burma Campaign UK, the London-based group campaigning for human rights and democracy in Burma
 Member of the Board of Independent News and Media
 Trustee, KPMG Foundation
 Chancellor of Oxford Brookes University (1994–2001)
 Chancellor of Sheffield Hallam University (appointed in 2018)
 Chair, British Council (1998–2004)
 Chair, Human Genetics Commission (1998–2007)
 President of the National Children's Bureau (1998–2005)
 Kennedy chaired the Power Commission (November 2005 – March 2006), which examined the problem of democratic disengagement in the United Kingdom. A report was produced which highlighted the "Myth of Apathy" and the lack of political engagement
 Chair of Power 2010, which aimed to carry forward the concepts behind the Power Commission into the UK 2010 General Election
 Member of the World Bank Institute's External Advisory Council
 Member of the board of the British Museum
 Member of the High Level Panel of Legal Experts on Media Freedom
Vice-president of the Haldane Society
 Vice-president of the Association of Women Barristers
 Patron, London International Festival of Theatre liftfestival.com
 Patron, Institute for Learning (IfL) http://www.ifl.ac.uk
 Patron, Liberty
 Patron, UNLOCK, The National Association of Ex-Offenders
 Patron, Debt Doctors Foundation UK (DD-UK)
 Patron, Tower Hamlets Summer University
 Patron, Rights Watch (UK)
 Patron of SafeHands for Mothers, a UK-based charity whose mission is to improve maternal and newborn health by harnessing the power of the visual, through the production of films. 
 Chair, Howard League's Commission of Inquiry into Violence in Penal Institutions for Young People (the final report, Banged Up, Beaten Up, Cutting Up, published in 1995)
 Chair, Reading Borough Council's Commission of Inquiry into the health, environmental and safety aspects of the Atomic Weapons Establishment at Aldermaston (final report Secrecy versus Safety, published in 1994)
 Chair, Royal Colleges of Pathologists' and of Pædiatrics' Inquiry into Sudden Infant Death (producing a protocol for the investigation of such deaths in 2004)
 Member of the Foreign Policy Centre's Advisory Council
 Formerly UK member of the International Bar Association's Task Force on Terrorism
 As Commissioner of the National Commission for Education, she chaired a committee on widening participation in further education and the commission's report, Learning Works, published in 1997.
 Chair, Booker Prize Foundation (2015–2020)
 Vice President of the Campaign for Homosexual Equality (from 2017)

Civic honours
 Created a life peer, as Baroness Kennedy of The Shaws''', of Cathcart in the City of Glasgow on 27 October 1997.
  Grand Cross of the Order of Merit of the Italian Republic on 23 March 2004.
  Commander of the Order of Academic Palms (2006).

Bibliography
 Eve was Framed: Women and British Justice, 1993;  
 Just Law: The changing face of justice and why it matters to us, 2004; Eve Was Shamed: How British Justice Is Failing Women, 2018; Misjustice: How British Law is Failing Women,'' 2019;

References

External links
Debrett's People of Today
Helena Kennedy's home page
Power Commission
 Helena Kennedy Foundation

1950 births
Living people
Scottish people of Irish descent
Lawyers from Glasgow
Scottish Roman Catholics
Labour Party (UK) life peers
Life peeresses created by Elizabeth II
People associated with Oxford Brookes University
People associated with SOAS University of London
Commandeurs of the Ordre des Palmes Académiques
Trustees of the British Museum
BBC television presenters
People educated at Holyrood Secondary School
Knights Grand Cross of the Order of Merit of the Italian Republic
British King's Counsel
British legal writers
Women academic administrators
People of the British Council
Chancellors of Sheffield Hallam University
Principals of Mansfield College, Oxford
Scottish women lawyers
Honorary Fellows of the British Academy
BBC 100 Women